Alex Gilvarry (b. 1981 on Staten Island, NY) is an American writer. He is the author of the novels From the Memoirs of a Non-Enemy Combatant (2012) and Eastman Was Here (2017). In 2009, Gilvarry graduated from CUNY - Hunter College's MFA Program in Creative Writing. He was included on the National Book Foundation's "5 Under 35" list in 2014, and Eastman Was Here was chosen as one of the best books of 2017 by Esquire.  He is a professor of Creative Writing at Monmouth University in New Jersey. He is 6'3" and lives on Staten Island and is married to the writer Alexandra Kleeman.

Bibliography 
 From the Memoirs of a Non-Enemy Combatant (2012)
 Eastman Was Here (2017)

References 

1981 births
Writers from Staten Island
Living people
Monmouth University faculty
21st-century American novelists
Hunter College alumni
American male novelists
Novelists from New York (state)